Signed French (français signé) is any of at least three manually coded forms of French that apply the words (signs) of a national sign language to French word order or grammar.  In France, Signed French uses the signs of French Sign Language; the Belgium system uses the signs of French Belgian Sign Language, and in Canada the signs of Quebec Sign Language.  Signed French is used in education and for simultaneous translation, not as a natural form of communication among deaf people.

French
French language